Kurtis MacDermid (born March 25, 1994) is a Canadian professional ice hockey defenseman currently playing for the Colorado Avalanche of the National Hockey League (NHL). MacDermid won the Stanley Cup with the Avalanche in 2022. He is mostly known as an enforcer.

Playing career
MacDermid first played junior hockey with the Owen Sound Greys in the Greater Ontario Junior Hockey League. He was selected in the 2010 OHL Priority Draft, 139th overall by the Owen Sound Attack. He later made his debut in the Ontario Hockey League with the Attack in the 2011–12 season before signing as an undrafted free agent to a three-year, entry-level contract with the Los Angeles Kings on September 13, 2012.

He concluded his junior career with the Erie Otters in the 2014–15 season, before beginning his professional career within the Kings organization, assigned to AHL affiliate, the Ontario Reign, to begin the 2015–16 season.

After two seasons as a regular on the blue line with the Reign and having made positive progress at the conclusion of his rookie contract, MacDermid was re-signed to a one-year, two-way contract extension on July 14, 2017. After competing in training camp and pre-season, MacDermid made the opening night roster with the Kings for the 2017–18 season. He made his NHL debut with Los Angeles on opening night in a 2-0 victory over the Philadelphia Flyers on October 5, 2017. He scored his first NHL goal in a 4-0 win over the Montreal Canadiens on October 26, 2017. MacDermid was sent down to the AHL on January 16, 2018. On January 3, 2020 MacDermid was suspended for 2 games for an illegal check.

On July 21, 2021, MacDermid was selected from the Kings at the 2021 NHL Expansion Draft by the Seattle Kraken. On July 27, 2021, the Kraken then traded him to the Colorado Avalanche in exchange for a fourth round pick in 2023. MacDermid signed a two-year contract extension with the Avalanche on April 5, 2022. MacDermid did not appear for the Avalanche during the 2022 Stanley Cup playoffs as they won the Stanley Cup for the third time in franchise history.

Personal life
MacDermid is the son of former NHL player Paul MacDermid and was born in Quebec City, Quebec during his father's stint with the Quebec Nordiques, but was raised in Sauble Beach, Ontario. His older brother, Lane also played in the NHL with the Boston Bruins, Dallas Stars and Calgary Flames.

Career statistics

Awards and honours

References

External links

1994 births
Living people
Anglophone Quebec people
Canadian ice hockey defencemen
Colorado Avalanche players
Erie Otters players
Ice hockey people from Quebec City
Los Angeles Kings players
Ontario Reign (AHL) players
Owen Sound Attack players
Stanley Cup champions
Undrafted National Hockey League players